Alice Louise Sharpe (born 3 May 1994) is an Irish racing cyclist, who currently rides for UCI Women's Continental Team . She rode in the women's road race event at the 2018 UCI Road World Championships.

References

External links
 

1994 births
Living people
Irish female cyclists
Place of birth missing (living people)
European Games competitors for Ireland
Cyclists at the 2019 European Games
20th-century Irish women
21st-century Irish women